The Campaign for a More Prosperous Britain was a political party in the United Kingdom.  It was founded prior to the February 1974 general election by Tom Keen and Harold Smith, both business owners in Manchester.

Keen was the party's leader.  He had become a millionaire through property development, and before forming the campaign.
The party called for voters not to vote for its candidates, but for tactical voting to defeat the Labour Party; it distributed anti-Labour literature.  Despite this, some of its candidacies received hundreds of votes, with Keen's candidacy in Portsmouth North at the October 1974 general election attracting 1.0% of all the votes cast.

The party first came to public attention when members plastered the headquarters of the Trades Union Congress with anti-union posters.  It was also strongly opposed to the Communist Party of Great Britain.

Smith stood against Labour Party leader Harold Wilson at the February 1974 general election, taking 234 votes.  At the October general election, Keen and Smith set a new record by standing simultaneously in eleven and twelve constituencies, respectively.  With two associates who stood in a single constituency each, the campaign stood in a total of 25 seats, receiving 4,301 votes.  Each constituency was a marginal seat held by the Labour Party, but Labour held each seat at the election.

Keen stood for the party again in the 1979 general election and several by-elections.  However, the party was apparently dissolved in the early 1980s, Keen standing in five Labour seats at the 1983 general election as an independent.

Results

February 1974 general election

October 1974 general election

By-elections, 1974–1979

1979 general election

By-elections, 1979–1983

At Beaconsfield, Keen stood under the description "Benn in 10 unless Proportional Representation".

References

Political parties established in 1974
Defunct political parties in England
1974 establishments in the United Kingdom
1980s disestablishments in the United Kingdom